Southern Avenue, now renamed Dr. Meghnad Saha Sarani, is an avenue in South Kolkata connecting Gol Park with Kalighat. It falls under the Ballygunge area. It is a  road with a centre boulevard that runs from Gariahat Road on the east to Shyama Prasad Mukherjee Road on the west, crossing Sarat Bose Road-Deboki Kumar Bose Sarani (near Rabindra Sarobar Stadium) on its way. The road is renamed after Dr. Meghnad Saha, a famous Indian scientist.

Localities
Rabindra Sarobar, earlier called Dhakuria Lake/Ballygunge Lake, an artificial lake, is on Southern Avenue. It comprises areas leased to several rowing clubs and cricket academies, a Safari garden, a virtually defunct children's park and play center (Lily Pool), an auditorium Nazrul Mancha, swimming pool training centres etc. Many prominent Roads either originate from or merge into Southern Avenue on its course either to its north or south, namely Keyatala Road, Jatin Bagchi Road, Lake Road, Lake View Road, Sarat Chatterjee Avenue, Lake Avenue, Lake Place, S R Das Road & Janak Road. Southern Avenue is dotted with beautiful private bungalows and several high rise apartments like 'Dakshinayan', 'Green View', 'Abhisarika', 'Ananda', 'Ashoka', 'Avenue House', 'Sarobar', 'Lake Towers', 'Arihant Garden' and 'Fort Legend' to name a few.

Landmarks

 Rabindra Sarobar or Dhakuria Lake; an artificial lake created when the area south of Kalighat was drained and new streets laid out by Calcutta Municipal Development Authority (CMDA).
 Birla Academy of Art and Culture
 Ramakrishna Mission Institute of Culture, Gol Park
 Lake Kalibari
 Indian Life Saving Society (ILSS), Kolkata, formerly called Anderson Club
 Nazrul Mancha, Kolkata
 Vivekananda Park
 Calcutta Rowing Club
 Bengal Rowing Club
 Rabindra Sarobar Stadium (Lake Stadium)
 AMRI Medical Centre
 Morris Garage showroom "MG KOLKATA"
 The Asoka Stores (Medicine Shop)
 Medinova Diagnostic Centre
 Southern Plaza Hotel
 Menoka Cinema (on Sarat Chatterjee Avenue)
 Southern Avenue swimming club
 Nava Nalanda High School
 NG Medicare
 Vibes

One of the most important places on the avenue is the Birla Academy of Art and Culture Museum which was established in 1966. Collections include paintings of the medieval period as well as modern art and some archaeological specimens. The Museum holds regular exhibitions of modern Indian sculptors and painters. One of the restaurants that is near to the Southern Avenue is the Wrong Place (Spelt at times as 'Xrong Place').

Restaurants
 The Grub Club Telephone
 Indthalia
 The French Loaf (on Jatin Bagchi Road)
 Marco Polo
 Mandarin
 Tandoor House
 Oceania (Hotel Southern Plaza)
 The Silver Oak
 Casa Toscana (on Sarat Chatterjee Avenue)
 The Funjabi Tadka
 Crave Foodworks
 Garden Cafe
 Azad Hind Dhaba
 Macazzo
 What's Up Cafe
 The Dugout
 Bijoli Grill

References

Streets in Kolkata